Gunplay is a graphic novel, written by Jorge Vega, with art by Dominic Vivona. It was published by Platinum Studios in 2008.

Publication history
Vage was the winner of the 2007 Platinum Studios Comic Book Challenge, besting over two million other submissions.

An issue #0 preview comic book was released in March 2008, which was followed by a graphic novel.

Plot
Buffalo Soldier Abner Meeks is condemned to roam the plains with a demonic gun that forces him to kill someone once a day or suffer soul-searing pain.

Christopher Priest provided prose backup stories in each issue, chronicling the "Legend of Abner."

Other media

Television series
Platinum Studios and Fox 21 are developing a Gunplay series to be written by Final Destination and X-Files executive producer Glen Morgan. Platinum Studios' Scott Mitchell Rosenberg will executive produce.

See also
Cowboys & Aliens
Weird West

Notes

References

External links

Jorge Vega's site

2008 comics debuts
American graphic novels
Platinum Studios titles
Western (genre) comics